Joyce A. King (1 September 1920 – 10 June 2001) was an Australian sprinter. She was born in Sydney.

In 1948, she won the Australian national championships over 100 yards and 220 yards.

At the 1948 Summer Olympics in London the same year she won a silver medal in 4 x 100 metres relay with teammates Shirley Strickland, June Maston and Elizabeth McKinnon.

References
 
 
 Source: Family of her twin brother, Bruce King

1920 births
2001 deaths
Athletes (track and field) at the 1948 Summer Olympics
Australian female sprinters
Olympic athletes of Australia
Olympic silver medalists for Australia
Athletes from Sydney
Medalists at the 1948 Summer Olympics
Olympic silver medalists in athletics (track and field)
Olympic female sprinters
20th-century Australian women